Cho Yiu Chuen is a public housing estate developed by the Hong Kong Housing Society in Lai King, Kwai Chung, New Territories, Hong Kong. It is located near Highland Park, Lai King Estate, Yuet Lai Court, Lai King Sports Centre and Lai King Building of Princess Margaret Hospital.

The estate consists of eight residential blocks completed between 1976 and 1981. It also provides elderly persons flats at Chung Ling Sheh. It was named for Sir Cho Yiu Kwan, one of the founders of Hong Kong Housing Society.

Houses

Demographics
According to the 2016 by-census, Cho Yiu Chuen had a population of 7,159. The median age was 47.6 and the majority of residents (96.5 per cent) were of Chinese ethnicity. The average household size was 2.8 people. The median monthly household income of all households (i.e. including both economically active and inactive households) was HK$25,580.

Politics
Cho Yiu Chuen is located in Cho Yiu constituency of the Kwai Tsing District Council. It was formerly represented by Choi Nga-man, who was elected in the 2019 elections until July 2021.

Distinctions
Cho Yiu Chuen received a Certificate of Merit at the 1981 Hong Kong Institute of Architects Annual Awards. Kai King Lau is the tallest building in Cho Yiu Chuen with 38 storeys. It was also the tallest public housing building in the world at that time.

Education
Cho Yiu is in Primary One Admission (POA) School Net 65, which includes multiple aided schools (schools operated independently of the government but funded with government money); none of the schools in the net are government schools.

See also

Public housing estates in Kwai Chung

References

Public housing estates in Hong Kong
Residential skyscrapers in Hong Kong
Residential buildings completed in 1976
Residential buildings completed in 1978
Residential buildings completed in 1981
Kwai Chung
Lai King